Dorf and the First Games of Mount Olympus is a 1988 comedy short film starring Tim Conway as Dorf and Vincent Schiavelli as Leonard.

Plot
Set in A.D. 1 during the days of the Roman Empire, Emperor Dorf announces the first Olympic Games as a way to promote peace between the nations.

Each competition either includes only Dorf as a competitor, or Dorf sparring with Leonard: shot put, fencing, discus, pole vault, relay race, javelin, weightlifting, hurdles, balance beam, hammer throw and boxing. In the end, Dorf, as emperor, is awarded first prize despite losing most of the head-to-head matches to Leonard. The prize is a massive millstone, which causes Dorf to tumble off the podium when it is placed on his neck.

External links 
 

Dorf and the First Games of Mount Olympus
Dorf and the First Games of Mount Olympus
First Games of Mount Olympus
Dorf and the First Games of Mount Olympus
1988 comedy films
1980s English-language films